Statistics of L. League in the 2005 season. Nippon TV Beleza won the championship.

Division 1

Result

League awards

Best player

Top scorers

Best eleven

Best young player

Division 2

Result 

 Best Player: Miwa Yonetsu, INAC Leonessa

See also 
 Empress's Cup

External links 
  Nadeshiko League Official Site
 Season at soccerway.com

Nadeshiko League seasons
1
L
Japan
Japan